The women's hammer throw event at the 2009 European Athletics U23 Championships was held in Kaunas, Lithuania, at S. Dariaus ir S. Girėno stadionas (Darius and Girėnas Stadium) on 18 July.

Medalists

Results

Final
18 July

Participation
According to an unofficial count, 14 athletes from 12 countries participated in the event.

 (2)
 (1)
 (1)
 (2)
 (1)
 (1)
 (1)
 (1)
 (1)
 (1)
 (1)
 (1)

References

Hammer throw
Hammer throw at the European Athletics U23 Championships